Arthur Young (31 October 1855 – 20 October 1938) was a Scotland international rugby union player.

Rugby Union career

Amateur career
Young played for Edinburgh Academicals.

Provincial career
Young played for Edinburgh District on 24 January 1874.

International career
Young played in one match for Scotland on 23 February 1874. It was against England at The Oval.

References

1855 births
1938 deaths
Scottish rugby union players
Scotland international rugby union players
Rugby union forwards
University of St Andrews RFC players
Edinburgh Academicals rugby union players
Edinburgh District (rugby union) players